Wilson Nathaniel "Nat" Howell (September 14, 1939 – December 17, 2020) was an American diplomat and educator. He served as the United States Ambassador to Kuwait from 1987 to 1991.

Born in Portsmouth, Virginia, Howell earned a B.A. at the University of Virginia, 1961. He earned a Ph.D. in Government and Foreign Affairs at UVA, 1965, and entered the Foreign Service. From 1970 to 1972, he studied Arabic at the Foreign Service Institute, Beirut, Lebanon.

On May 26, 1987, President Reagan announced his intention to nominate Howell to be Ambassador of the U.S. to Kuwait. Howell was at his post awaiting reassignment when, on August 2, 1990, Iraq invaded Kuwait. The U.S. Embassy in Kuwait City, was declared closed by Saddam Hussein on August 24, by which time many Americans and other nationals had taken refuge on the embassy compound. Iraq's declaration of the annexation of Kuwait, by means of trumped-up historical, economic and political pretexts, was not recognized by the U.S. It was decided to keep the mission open, under siege, as Iraq would not allow non-diplomats to leave the country (Iraq retained foreign "guests" as human shields, to deter military strikes).

For reasons best known to himself, Saddam relented and allowed all persons on the compound to leave overland, by way of Baghdad, in mid-December 1990, before the start of the Gulf War. At that point, Howell and the remainder of his staff left the embassy unoccupied, though technically not "closed," until his successor, Skip Gnehm, returned upon the liberation of Kuwait.

In 1992, W. Nathaniel Howell joined the faculty of UVA. His positions included diplomat-in-residence; director, Arab Peninsula and Gulf Studies Program; member of the Steering Committee of CIAG; and John Minor Maury, Jr., Professor of Public Affairs. He retired as Professor Emeritus in early 2015. He died in Charlottesville on December 17, 2020, at the age of 81.

Service chronology

Further reading

References

External links
Presidential Nomination of W. Nathaniel Howell To Be U.S. Ambassador to Kuwait
Commencement Address, University of Virginia Graduation (19 May 1991)
Guide to Amb. Howell's papers (unrestricted: Special Collections, the University of Virginia Library)
Guide to Amb. Howell's papers (restricted access: Special Collections, the University of Virginia Library)
ADST-DACOR webpage for "Strangers When We Met".

1939 births
2020 deaths
People from Portsmouth, Virginia
University of Virginia alumni
University of Virginia faculty
Ambassadors of the United States to Kuwait
United States Foreign Service personnel